Banksia 'Lemon Glow', also known by its extended cultivar name Banksia spinulosa var. cunninghamii 'Lemon Glow', is a form of Banksia spinulosa var. cunninghamii with lemon-yellow flowers. It was selected by Alf Salkin from a wild population on French Island, Victoria, and registered as a cultivar on 5 October 1982. It typically grows 2–3 m (7–10 feet) tall by 2 m (7 feet) wide. It flowers from April to May.

Unlike its parent species, its flower styles are yellow rather than black. In all other respects it is typical of B. spinulosa var. cunninghamii.

References

 

Lemon Glow
Garden plants of Australia